Jhang Sadar railway station is located in Jhang city of Punjab province, Pakistan on the Shorkot–Lalamusa Branch Line.

See also
Jhang District
 List of railway stations in Pakistan
 Pakistan Railways

References

External links

Railway stations in Jhang District
Railway stations on Shorkot–Lalamusa Branch Line